Louis Whitley Strieber (born June 13, 1945) is an American writer best known for his horror novels The Wolfen and The Hunger and for Communion, a non-fiction account of his alleged experiences with non-human entities. He has maintained a dual career of author of fiction and advocate of paranormal concepts through his best-selling non-fiction books, his Unknown Country web site, and his podcast, Dreamland.

Early life and education
Strieber was born in San Antonio, Texas, the son of Kathleen Mary (Drought) and Karl Strieber, a lawyer. He attended Central Catholic  High School in San Antonio, Texas. He was educated at the University of Texas at Austin and the London School of Film Technique, graduating from each in 1968. He then worked for several advertising firms in New York City, rising to the level of vice president before leaving in 1977 to pursue a writing career.

Early fiction
Strieber began his career as a novelist with the horror novels The Wolfen (1978) and The Hunger (1981), both of which were made into feature films, followed by the less successful horror novels Black Magic (1982) and The Night Church (1983).

Strieber then turned to speculative fiction with social conscience. Collaborating with James Kunetka, he wrote Warday (1984), about the dangers of limited nuclear warfare, and Nature's End (1986), a novel about environmental apocalypse. He independently authored Wolf of Shadows (1985), a young adult novel set in the aftermath of a nuclear war.

In 1986, Strieber's fantasy novel Catmagic was published with co-authorship credited to Jonathan Barry, who was billed as an aerospace industry consultant and a practicing witch. In the 1987 paperback edition, Strieber states that Jonathan Barry is fictitious and that he is the sole author of Catmagic. Strieber's personal publishing company, Walker & Collier, is named after two characters in Catmagic.

Later, less successful thrillers by Strieber include Billy (1990), The Wild (1991), Unholy Fire (1992) and The Forbidden Zone (1993).

Short stories

The author's short stories were collected in the 1997 limited edition volume Evenings with Demons. More recent short stories include "The Good Neighbor", published in Twilight Zone: 19 Original Stories on the 50th Anniversary, and "The Christmas Spirits" (2012), a modern retelling of Charles Dickens's A Christmas Carol.

Communion and "the visitors"
Strieber contends that he was abducted from his cabin in upstate New York on the evening of December 26, 1985, by non-human beings. He wrote about this experience and related experiences in Communion (1987), his first non-fiction book. Although the book is perceived generally as an account of alien abduction, Strieber draws no conclusions about the identity of the alleged abductors. He refers to the beings as "the visitors", a name chosen to be as neutral as possible to entertain the possibility that they are not extraterrestrials. Neurologist Steven Novella remarks that the details of Whitley's tale of waking up seemingly paralyzed fits the description of hypnagogia, a fairly common neurological phenomenon that has been mistaken by some for an intervention by demons or aliens.

Both the hardcover and paperback edition of Communion reached the number one position on The New York Times Best Seller list (non-fiction), with more than 2 million copies collectively sold.

Although it was published as non-fiction, the book editor of the Los Angeles Times pronounced the follow-up title, Transformation (1988), to be fiction and removed it from the non-fiction best-seller list (it nonetheless made the top 10 on the fiction side of the chart). "It's a reprehensible thing," Strieber responded. "My book is a true story ... Placing this book on the fiction list is an ugly example of exactly the kind of blind prejudice that has hurt human progress for many generations." Criticism noting the similarity between the non-human beings in Strieber's autobiographical accounts and the non-human beings in his initial horror novels was typically acknowledged by the author as a fair observation, but not indicative of his autobiographical works being fictional: "The mysterious small beings that figure prominently in Catmagic seem to be an unconscious rendering of [the visitors], created before I was aware that they may be real."

Since the 1987 publication of Communion, Strieber wrote four additional autobiographies detailing his experiences with the visitors: Transformation (1988), a direct follow-up; Breakthrough: The Next Step (1995), a reflection on the original events and accounts of the sporadic contact he'd subsequently experienced; The Secret School (1996), in which he examines strange memories from his childhood; and lastly, Solving the Communion Enigma: What Is to Come (2011).

In Solving the Communion Enigma, Strieber reflects on how advances in scientific understanding since his 1987 publication may shed light on what he perceived, noting, "Among other things, since I wrote Communion, science has determined that parallel universes may be physically real and that time travel may in some way be possible". The book is a consolidation of UFO sightings and related phenomena, including crop circles, alien abductions, mutilations and deaths in an attempt to discern any kind of meaningful overall pattern. Strieber concludes that the human species is being shepherded to a higher level of understanding and existence within an endless "multiverse" of matter, energy, space and time. He also writes more candidly about the deleterious effects his initial experiences had upon him while staying at his upstate New York cabin in the 1980s, noting, "I was regularly drinking myself to sleep when we were there. I would listen to the radio until late hours, drinking vodka..."

Other visitor-themed books of Strieber's include Majestic (1989), a novel about the Roswell UFO incident; The Communion Letters (1997, reissued in 2003), a collection of letters from readers reporting experiences similar to Strieber's; Confirmation (1998), in which Strieber reviews a variety of evidence that is suggestive of alien contact, and considers what more would be required to provide 'confirmation'; The Grays (2006) a novel in which his impressions of alien contact are presented through a fictional thriller/espionage narrative, and; Hybrids (2011) a fictional narrative that imagines human/alien hybrids being born into the modern world.

Additional visitor-themed writings include a screenplay for the 1989 film Communion, directed by Philippe Mora and starring Christopher Walken as Strieber. The movie covers material from the books Communion and Transformation. Strieber has stated that he was dissatisfied with the film, which utilized scenes of improvised dialogue and includes themes not present in his books. Strieber also wrote a screenplay for his novel Majestic, which to date has not been filmed.

Whitley Strieber has repeatedly expressed frustration that his experiences have been taken as "alien contact" when he does not actually know what they were. Strieber has reported anomalous childhood experiences and suggested that he may have suffered some sort of early interference by intelligence or military agencies.

He was extensively tested for temporal lobe epilepsy and other brain abnormalities at his own request, but his brain was found to be functioning normally. The results of these tests were reported in his book Transformation.

The Whitman Massacre

In Communion, Strieber wrote of having told friends over the years that he had witnessed the University of Texas tower shooting in Austin, Texas, on August 1, 1966, when he had in fact not been on campus that day:

Strieber presents his claim to have witnessed the Whitman shooting in Communion in the context of alien abduction screen memories, expressing puzzlement at having repeated this false claim over the years. In two interviews prior to Communion, however, Strieber described in graphic detail what he purportedly witnessed. In a 1985 interview with Douglas Winter published in Faces of Fear, Strieber described:

Critics including panelists on the British television discussion programme After Dark questioned Strieber about his statements in Communion about not having been at the Whitman shooting. Strieber announced that in his latest book, Transformation, he had changed his mind and decided he had witnessed the shooting. Despite this, according to public information, no "little boy on a bicycle" was killed by Whitman that day. Further, according to Ed Conroy in his Report on Communion, Strieber's mother stated during an interview that Strieber had been in Austin the day of the shooting, but not on campus.

The Master of the Key
In 2001, Strieber self-published a book titled The Key, in which he claimed that while on a book tour for his book Confirmation, he was visited in the early morning of June 6, 1998, at his Toronto hotel room by an unknown man who presented him with a "new image of God". Strieber engaged the man in dialogue for "half an hour," though Strieber also conceded that "once our conversation was transcribed, it became obvious that more time was involved" and "he must have been with me for at least two hours". Subjects discussed included the Holocaust, sudden climate change, the afterlife, psychic ability, UFOs, and using the human soul in machines. According to Strieber, the man did not give his name, and in the book Strieber refers to him as Master of the Key. While he was writing the book, Strieber said that unlike other events he had experienced "the reality of this one isn't in question."

In the section of The Key entitled The Conversation, Strieber presented a transcription of the conversation which Strieber has claimed is "80 to 90 percent accurate", "90% accurate or more". In 2011, Tarcher/Penguin printed a new edition of The Key, which contained significant differences from the version of the transcription contained in Strieber's original Walker & Collier edition. In response, Strieber alleged that his own 2001 self-published edition had been "censored" by "sinister forces".

Current works
Whitley Strieber is currently the host of the spiritual and science-themed podcast Dreamland, available on a weekly basis from his website, Unknown Country. The program was a former companion show to Coast to Coast AM, with both shows founded by broadcaster Art Bell, before being taken on by Strieber in 1999.

Strieber has also continued writing novels, including The Last Vampire (2001), and Lilith's Dream (2003), both being sequels to his 1981 vampire novel The Hunger. As well, he has authored 2012: The War For Souls (2007), a horror novel about an interdimensional invasion, and Critical Mass (2009), a thriller about nuclear terrorism. Strieber also co-authored the graphic novel The Nye Incidents (2008), along with co-authors Craig Spector and Guss Floor.

His novel The Omega Point is "based on a hidden connection between 2012 and the Book of Revelation". This title, released in 2010, is Strieber's second novel dealing with the subject of 2012, the first being 2012: The War for Souls.

An entry in the popular teen-lit genre, Melody Burning, was published in late 2011. The story centers on a feral teenager who lives within a skyrise building unnoticed, and a new tenant, a pop-star named Melody, with whom he falls in love.

In 2012, Strieber began an alien-themed thriller series called "Alien Hunter", the first volume of which was published in August 2013. A series based on the book was released by SyFy in April 2016 and called "Hunters".
The second volume in the series, Alien Hunter: Underworld, was published in August 2014.

In March 2014, Strieber and his wife Anne published an account of her illness called Miraculous Journey. Mrs. Strieber experienced a cerebral hemorrhage in 2004 and in 2013 underwent treatment for a brain tumor.

Strieber collaborated with religious scholar Jeffrey J. Kripal on 2016's Super Natural: A New Vision of the Unexplained,  a study of occultism, supernatural experiences, and parapsychology that explores "why the supernatural is neither fantasy nor fiction but a vital and authentic aspect of life".

Media appearances
In November 1989, Strieber made an extended appearance on the British television discussion programme After Dark alongside, among others, astronaut Buzz Aldrin.

The following year on February 4, 1990, Strieber made an Irish appearance on RTE’s Kenny Live to discuss his experience of alien abduction.

Strieber, and perhaps his wife Anne, made a cameo appearance in the 2009 movie Race to Witch Mountain.

Television appearances during the publication of Communion were numerous and included The Tonight Show with Johnny Carson. He has made appearances (including a 2006 interview on the Late Late Show with Craig Ferguson) in support of his newer novels.

He has been featured many times on the overnight radio show Coast to Coast AM, both as guest and guest-host. On April 6, 2013, he did a two-hour interview with John B. Wells.

In 2022, Strieber appeared in the upcoming documentary, Alien Abduction: Answers.

Cultural influences
In the TV series Babylon 5, there is an alien race that is similar to the Greys in Communion. This race is named the Streibs after Whitley Strieber.

In an episode of The X-Files, "Jose Chung's From Outer Space", the cover of the book From Outer Space is a parody of the cover of Communion (the difference being that the alien on the cover is depicted smoking a cigarette).

In the 120th book in The Hardy Boys series, The Case of the Cosmic Kidnapping (1993), the character of "Hodding Wheatley", a Connecticut-based writer who had undergone UFO experiences, is inspired by Strieber, as indicated by the surname of the character "Wheatley".

In Search of Truth, a 2001 concept album by Swedish progressive metal band Evergrey, was inspired by the ideas presented in Communion.

The post-punk dance music group The Mekano Set cite Whitley Strieber's non-fiction work as an influence on their work. They wrote a tribute to Strieber for their 2013 album The Three Thieves (a reference to characters from Strieber's novel The Grays) entitled What is it Whit?

The closing track of U.N.K.L.E. debut album "Psyence Fiction" (1998) features vocals from Whitley Strieber, taken from a weekend edition of Art Bell’s Coast to Coast AM nightly radio talk show.

Personal life
Whitley Strieber is currently a practicing Catholic. He is also associated with the Gurdjieff Foundation. He left regular work in the Foundation shortly before the experiences reported in Communion but remains involved in the mystical teachings of G. I. Gurdjieff and P. D. Ouspensky and makes frequent references to them in his non-fiction writings.

Strieber was married to Anne Strieber until her death in 2015. According to his website, he lives in California as of April 2019.

Fiction

Nonfiction
 Communion (1987)
 Transformation (1988)
 Breakthrough (1995)
 The Secret School (1996)
 The Communion Letters (1997) (with Anne Strieber (editors) )
 Confirmation (1998)
 The Coming Global Superstorm (1999) (with Art Bell)
 The Key (2001)
 The Path (2002)
 Solving the Communion Enigma (2012)
 Miraculous Journey (2014) (with Anne Strieber)
 Super Natural: A New Vision of the Unexplained (2016) (with Jeffrey J. Kripal)
 The Afterlife Revolution (2017) (with Anne Strieber)
 A New World (2019)
 Jesus: A New Vision (2020)

Film and TV adaptations
 Wolfen (1981; Orion/Warner Bros.)
 The Hunger (1983; Metro-Goldwyn-Mayer)
 Communion (1989; New Line Cinema)
 The Day After Tomorrow (2004; Lionsgate Films)
 Hunters (2016; SyFy)

See also

List of UFO sightings
UFO

References

Bibliography

External links

 
 
 Lilith's Dream, Strieber's Hunger Uncovered, Book Review by Hertzan Chimera, The Open Critic; 
 Bibliography at SciFan
 Gurdjieff Legominism Forum
 The "Transformation" of Whitley Strieber (from the November, 1988 issue of BASIS, the Bay Area Skeptics newsletter), critical article by Robert Sheaffer

 Problems with Strieber and The Key A scholarly analysis of Whitley Strieber's The Key

20th-century American novelists
21st-century American novelists
Alien abduction reports
American fantasy writers
American horror writers
American male novelists
American memoirists
Central Catholic Marianist High School alumni
American science fiction writers
American thriller writers
American UFO writers
Fourth Way
Non-fiction environmental writers
Ufologists
University of Texas at Austin alumni
Writers from San Antonio
1945 births
Living people
American male short story writers
20th-century American short story writers
21st-century American short story writers
Novelists from Texas
21st-century American non-fiction writers
American male non-fiction writers
Catholics from Texas
Contactees
20th-century American male writers
21st-century American male writers